Rabah Soudani (born 8 April 1985) is an Algerian handball player currently playing for Cherbourg and the Algerian National Team.

Soudani was chosen in the Algerian team for the 2009 World Men's Handball Championship in Croatia.

References

1985 births
Living people
Sportspeople from Roubaix
Algerian male handball players
French sportspeople of Algerian descent
Mediterranean Games competitors for Algeria
Competitors at the 2009 Mediterranean Games